The National Social Security Fund (NSSF) is the government agency of Tanzania responsible for the collection, safekeeping, responsible investment, and distribution of retirement funds of all employees in all sectors of the Tanzania economy that do not fall under the governmental pension schemes. There are one other pension fund organizations in the country; the Public Services Social Security(PSSSF). Fund for all employees working directly under the government and for all employees working under governmental Parastatal organization</ref>

The NSSF was founded in 1997 as the successor to the defunct National Provident Fund (NPF). NSSF covers all other employers in the country and participation for both employers and employees is compulsory. NSSF is both a pension fund and a provident fund.

History 
The social security scheme dates back to 1945 where all social security issues were handled by the NPF. The National Provident Fund Act was enacted in 1964 and amended in 1968. The NPF became defunct in 1997 and the Act of Parliament No. 28 of 1997 replaced the NPF with the NSSF.

Corporate affairs

Management and ownership
The company is entirely owned by the government of Tanzania and is one of the four social security funds in the country. The others are the Parastatal Pension Fund, the Public Service Pensions Fund, and the Local Authority Pension Fund. All the funds formerly were limited to separate sectors of the workforce; however, the regulations were liberalized in the early 2000s with all funds being authorized to enroll any employees in the formal and informal sector.

Board members
The NSSF is managed by a board of twelve members, not including the director general. All board members must be Tanzanian nationals, and none of the board members may hold executive positions. The board has three specialized committees to manage operations: the Finance and Investment Committee, the Audit Committee, and the Staff Committee.

Business trends

A majority of NSSF's revenue comes from employee and employer contributions. The program is a compulsory scheme and is financed with a contribution of 20 percent of employees' salaries, with half of that paid by employers and the other half paid by employees.

The key trends for NSSF for 2007-2011 are shown below (as at year ending 30 June):

Headquarters

The NSSF head office is at the Benjamin Mkapa Pension Towers in Dar es Salaam. The building formerly was named the Mafuta House. NSSF has an office in all major cities and all regional capitals.

Investments

Investment portfolio

The NSSF's investment policy requires the fund to invest 75 percent of its total annual sources. The fund traditionally invests in government securities, fixed deposits, corporate bonds, loans, equities, and real estate. Most of the investments are in loans and government securities and a large percentage of the income comes from interest collections. Recently, the NSSF has begun to invest heavily in real estate and have undertaken multi-billion shillings construction projects in various parts of the country.

NSSF Investment Portfolio 2006/07 – 2010/11

Major Real-estate Projects

Kigamboni Bridge 

The Kigamboni bridge is a joint venture between the Government of Tanzania (40%) and the National Social Security Fund (60%). The Bridge is 680m long and connects the Kurasini in Dar-es-salaam to Kigamboni. Furthermore, the money will involve upgrading of the nearby highway infrastructure to reduce congestion around the bridge. The bridge is to cost $140 million and will be operational early 2016. The bridge will contain a toll plaza and will be the country's first toll road. The Fund aims to recover its revenue through toll booth collections.

Dege Eco Village 
Dege eco village is one of the largest investment projects conducted by NSSF. The satellite township is located in the Kigamboni area and covers an area of 300 acres. The state-of-the-art estate will house over 7000 homes and is anticipated to be completed in 2017. The estate will not only have homes but have schools, supermarkets, security infrastructure and various amenities. The investment project is worth $544 million and is a joint venture between the fund and Azimino Estate Housing Limited.

In 2016 NSSF admitted fraud in the giant project.

References

External links 

Economy of Tanzania
Companies of Tanzania
Government agencies of Tanzania
Finance in Tanzania
Pension funds